Avelãs de Caminho is a village and a civil parish of the municipality of Anadia, Portugal. The population in 2011 was 1,252, in an area of 6.45 km2.

References

Freguesias of Anadia, Portugal